Walter Hudson is an American politician serving in the Minnesota House of Representatives since 2023. A member of the Republican Party of Minnesota, Hudson represents District 30A in the northwestern Twin Cities metropolitan area, which includes the cities of St. Michael, Otsego and Albertville and parts of Hennepin and Wright Counties.

Early life, education and career 
Hudson was born in Detroit, Michigan. He received a bachelor's degree in information technology from the University of Phoenix. Hudson served on the Albertville, Minnesota city council for seven years from 2014 to 2021.

Minnesota House of Representatives 
Hudson was first elected to the Minnesota House of Representatives in 2022, after redistricting and the retirement of Republican incumbent Eric Lucero who decided to run for a seat in the Minnesota Senate. Hudson serves on the Children and Families Finance and Policy and Public Safety Finance and Policy Committees.

Electoral history

Personal life 
Hudson lives in Albertville, Minnesota with his wife, Carrie, and has two children.

References

External links 

Living people
21st-century American politicians
Republican Party members of the Minnesota House of Representatives
Minnesota city council members
University of Phoenix alumni
Politicians from Detroit
People from Wright County, Minnesota